Route 421, also known as Hampden Road, is a  north-south highway on northwestern Newfoundland in the Canadian province of Newfoundland and Labrador. It connects the town of Hampden, along with some other communities, with Route 420 (White Bay South Highway).

Route description

Route 421 begins at an intersection with Route 420 near the Trans-Canada Highway (Route 1) and it heads north through wooded areas for several kilometres to enter the Hampden town limits. The highway passes through the Bayside neighbourhood, where it has an intersection with a local road leading to Gold Cove, before passing through downtown. Route 421 now begins following the coastline as it leaves Hampden and passes through Galeville before entering The Beaches and coming to a dead end at the northern edge of the community.

Major intersections

References

421